Synaesthesia is the 2014 debut album by British progressive and alternative rock band Kyros. The album was produced by IQ guitarist, Michael Holmes. All music on Synaesthesia was written originally as a solo studio project by multi-instrumentalist and vocalist Shelby Logan Warne, with contributions from fellow Middlesex University attendee, guitarist Nikolas Jon Aarland and further contributions from guitarist, Ollie Hannifan.

The album was originally a self-titled release as Kyros were originally known as Synaesthesia.

Publicity and reception

Synaesthesia was released to critical acclaim having received a number of shining reviews from a variety of sources. The band have also since had a number of features and appearances in Classic Rock Magazine subsidiary, "Prog Magazine" with articles written by respected journalists, Malcolm Dome and Rich Wilson. The track 'Epiphany' also features on the free CD for issue 43 of the publication. The band's debut album has also received positive reviews from ProgArchives, Classic Rock Magazine, Dutch Progressive Rock Pages and Eclipsed Magazine.

Much to the band's surprise considering the debut album had not yet been released. In January 2014, issue 42 of Classic Rock Magazine presents Prog announced that Synaesthesia had come first place in their reader's poll for 'Tip for 2014'.

Artwork

The album features artwork by Freyja Dean, daughter of the respected artist Roger Dean. Freyja Dean created a large format piece of artwork using a mixture of ballpoint pen and water colour based on the inspiration of the word, Synaesthesia

The original Synaesthesia logo was also created by Dean at the same point, hand-drawn utilising black ballpoint pen.

Track listing

Personnel

Shelby Logan Warne – sequencing, lead vocals, drums, percussion, synthesisers
Nikolas Jon Aarland– guitar, bass guitar, backing vocals
Ollie Hannifan – guitar

Additional credits
Michael Holmes – Producing, additional electric guitars
Rob Aubrey – recording, mixing, mastering 
Freyja Dean – artwork

References

2014 debut albums